Middle classes or Middle Classes may refer to:

 The middle class, a social class
 Middle Classes: Their Rise and Sprawl, a 2001 BBC television documentary series